Sulwe is a children's fiction picture book by actress Lupita Nyong'o. It follows the story of a young girl who wishes for her dark skin to be lighter. The story is ultimately about colorism and learning to love oneself, no matter one's skin tone.

In 2020, the Kiswahili and Dholuo translations were made available in East Africa through Kenyan publishing firm Bunk Books.

Synopsis 
Sulwe has the darkest skin in her family and in her school. She wishes for her skin to be lighter, but through a supernatural experience, she comes to love her dark skin color.

In media

Film adaptation

In February 2021, Netflix announced an animated musical film adaptation based on the book.

References

2019 children's books
Books about race and ethnicity
Simon & Schuster books
American picture books
Children's books adapted into films